The year 1723 in music involved some significant events.

Events 
April 13 – Johann Sebastian Bach is given permission to leave Köthen to take up his new appointment (from May 5) as cantor and musical director of St. Thomas Church, Leipzig. Other candidates for the post included Georg Friedrich Kauffmann, Georg Philipp Telemann and Christoph Graupner.
July/August – Handel moves to 25 Brook Street, London, the modern-day Handel House Museum.
November 2 – J. S. Bach's cantata Höchsterwünschtes Freudenfest, BWV 194 is first performed for dedication of the church and organ at Störmthal.
December 26 – J. S. Bach's cantata Darzu ist erschienen der Sohn Gottes, BWV 40 is first performed in Leipzig.
Alessandro Scarlatti begins his last major work, a serenata for the marriage of the prince of Stigliano, which will be left unfinished at his death.
Publication of Opinioni de' cantori antichi e moderni by Pier Francesco Tosi.
Francesco Maria Veracini returns to Florence after a period in Germany.
Antonio Vandini and Giuseppe Tartini go into the service of Count Kinsky in Prague.

Classical music 
Attilio Ariosti – Caio Marzio Coriolano
Johann Sebastian Bach
Inventions and Sinfonias, BWV 772-801
Magnificat in E-flat major, BWV 243a
Fugue in C major, BWV 953
First cycle of church cantatas, on his first year of tenure as Thomaskantor:
Jesus nahm zu sich die Zwölfe, BWV 22
Du wahrer Gott und Davids Sohn, BWV 23
Es ist nichts Gesundes an meinem Leibe, BWV 25
Nun ist das Heil und die Kraft, BWV 50
Wer mich liebet, der wird mein Wort halten, BWV 59
O Ewigkeit, du Donnerwort, BWV 60
Sehet, welch eine Liebe, BWV 64
Lobe den Herrn, meine Seele, BWV 69a
Wachet! betet! betet! wachet!, BWV 70
Die Himmel erzählen die Ehre Gottes, BWV 76
Du sollt Gott, deinen Herren, lieben, BWV 77
Es reißet euch ein schrecklich Ende, BWV 90
Christus, der ist mein Leben, BWV 95
Herr, gehe nicht ins Gericht mit deinem Knecht, BWV 105
Preise, Jerusalem, den Herren, BWV 119
Erforsche mich, Gott, und erfahre mein Herz, BWV 136
Warum betrübst du dich, mein Herz, BWV 138
Herz und Mund und Tat und Leben, BWV 147
Bringet dem Herrn Ehre seines Namens, BWV 148
Ihr Menschen, rühmet Gottes Liebe, BWV 167
Ärgre dich, o Seele, nicht, BWV 186
Singet dem Herrn ein neues Lied, BWV 190
Höchsterwünschtes Freudenfest, BWV 194
Jesu, meine Freude, BWV 227
 Antonio Caldara – La concordia de' pianeti
Louis-Antoine Dornel – Concerts de simphonies
George Frideric Handel – Concerto Grosso in F major, HWV 331
Jean-Marie Leclair – 12 Violin Sonatas, Op. 1
John Loeillet – 6 Suites of Lessons for the Harpsichord
Marin Marais 
La Gamme et Autres Morceaux de Symphonie (inc. Sonnerie de Ste-Geneviève du Mont-de-Paris)
Alessandro Scarlatti 
29 Partite sopra l’aria della Folia
Primo e Secondo Libro di Toccate per Cembalo
 Giovanni Battista Somis – 12 Violin Sonatas, Op. 2
Georg Philipp Telemann
Hamburger Admiralitätsmusik (Hamburg Admiralty Music)
Overture-Suite in C major, TV 55:C3 "Wassermusik"
Siehe, es hat überwunden, TWV 1:1328 (attributed to J.S. Bach as BWV 219)
Antonio Vivaldi – The Four Seasons (approximate date)
Jan Dismas Zelenka 
Concerto a 8 in G major
Proh, quos criminis, ZWV 172

Opera
Giovanni Bononcini – Erminia
François Colin de Blamont – Les Festes grecques et romaines
Francesco Feo – Morano e Rosina
George Frideric Handel
Flavio
Ottone
Leonardo Leo – La’mpeca scoperta
Nicola Porpora 
Adelaide
Imeneo in Atene
Pietro Torri – Griselda
Antonio Vivaldi – Ercole su'l Termodonte, RV 710

Births 
April 25 – Giovanni Marco Rutini, composer (died 1797)
July 11 – Jean-François Marmontel, librettist (died 1799)
July 29 – Christlieb Siegmund Binder, composer (died 1789)
November 9 – Princess Anna Amalia of Prussia, composer (died 1787)
December 22 – Carl Friedrich Abel, composer (died 1787)
date unknown
Pascal Taskin, harpsichord and piano maker (died 1793)
Francesco Uttini, conductor and composer (died 1795)
John Wainwright, composer (died 1768)

Deaths 
February 7 – Carlo Francesco Pollarolo, composer (born c. 1653)
August 21 – Dimitrie Cantemir, prince and polymath (born 1673)
September 23 – William Babell, organist and composer (born 1690)

References 

 
18th century in music
Music by year